Milos Raickovich (Miloš Raičković) (born 1956) is a Serbian-American composer and anti-war activist. Some of his works are politically influenced. He was born in Belgrade, Yugoslavia. 

He has composed scores for Hong Kong director Evans Chan's films.

References

External links
Biography
New Classicism CD

American male composers
Yugoslav emigrants to the United States
Living people
1956 births
Musicians from Belgrade